The canton of Jaunay-Marigny (before March 2020: canton of Jaunay-Clan) is an administrative division of the Vienne department, western France. It was created at the French canton reorganisation which came into effect in March 2015. Its seat is in Jaunay-Marigny.

It consists of the following communes:
Beaumont Saint-Cyr
Chabournay
Dissay
Jaunay-Marigny
Saint-Georges-lès-Baillargeaux
Saint-Martin-la-Pallu

References

Cantons of Vienne